The 2021–22 Army Black Knights men's basketball team represented the United States Military Academy in the 2021–22 NCAA Division I men's basketball season. The Black Knights, led by sixth-year head coach Jimmy Allen, played their home games at Christl Arena in West Point, New York as members of the Patriot League.

Previous season
The Black Knights finished the 2020–21 season 12–10, 7–7 in Patriot League play to finish in second place in the North Division. In the Patriot League tournament, they defeated American in the quarterfinals, before being upset by Loyola (MD) in the semifinals. They received an invitation to the CBI, where they lost in the quarterfinals to Bellarmine.

Roster

Schedule and results

|-
!colspan=12 style=| Non-conference regular season

|-
!colspan=12 style=| Patriot League regular season

|-
!colspan=9 style=| Patriot tournament

Sources

References

Army Black Knights men's basketball seasons
Army
Army Black Knights men's basketball
Army Black Knights men's basketball